Phạm Thị Kim Huệ (born August 3, 1982) is a retired Vietnamese volleyball player. She was the youngest captain of Vietnam national team at the age of 19.

During the peak of her performance, no players in Southeast Asia can be played good at middle blocker like her.

Clubs 
  Thông tin Liên Việt Post Bank (1995 – 2011)
  Vietinbank VC (2012 – 2019)

Awards

Individual 
 1998 Asian Junior Championship "Miss Volleyball"
 2003 Asian Championship "Miss Volleyball"
 2004 VTV Cup "Miss Volleyball"
 2006 VTV9 - Binh Dien International Cup "Most Valuable Player"
 2010 VTV9 - Binh Dien International Cup "Best Middle Blocker"
 2011 VTV9 - Binh Dien International Cup "Most Valuable Player"
 2011 Asian Club Championship "Best Middle Blocker"

Clubs 
 2004 Vietnam League -  Champion, with Thông tin Liên Việt Post Bank
 2005 Vietnam League -  Champion, with Thông tin Liên Việt Post Bank
 2006 Vietnam League -  Champion, with Thông tin Liên Việt Post Bank
 2009 Vietnam League -  Runner-Up, with Thông tin Liên Việt Post Bank
 2010 Vietnam League -  Champion, with Thông tin Liên Việt Post Bank
 2011 Vietnam League -  Runner-Up, with Thông tin Liên Việt Post Bank
 2012 Vietnam League -  Runner-Up, with Vietinbank VC
 2013 Vietnam League -  Runner-Up, with Vietinbank VC
 2014 Vietnam League -  Bronze medal, with Vietinbank VC
 2015 Vietnam League -  Runner-Up, with Vietinbank VC
 2016 Vietnam League -  Champion, with Vietinbank VC
 2017 Vietnam League -  Bronze medal, with Vietinbank VC
 2018 Vietnam League -  Bronze medal, with Vietinbank VC

References

1982 births
Living people
Sportspeople from Hanoi
Vietnamese women's volleyball players
Vietnam women's international volleyball players
Volleyball players at the 2006 Asian Games
Southeast Asian Games silver medalists for Vietnam
Southeast Asian Games medalists in volleyball
Competitors at the 2017 Southeast Asian Games
Asian Games competitors for Vietnam
Middle blockers
21st-century Vietnamese women